Princess Insun (1542–1545) was a Joseon Royal Princess as the youngest daughter of King Jungjong and Queen Munjeong, also the youngest sister of King Myeongjong who died at very young age. Her tomb firstly located in Yangju, but later moved to Seosamneung at Goyang. Then, Jeongsu Temple (정수사, 淨水寺) was built for her and in 1564, although many Confucian students insisted on its abolition, her brother refused it with cited that it was her wondang.

References

1542 births
1545 deaths
Princesses of Joseon
16th-century Korean people
16th-century Korean women
Royalty and nobility who died as children